Paul Bui Chu Tao (January 21, 1909 in Tam Châu, - May 5, 2001) was Bishop of the Roman Catholic Diocese of Phát Diệm.

Life

The Apostolic Vicar of Phát Diệm, Jean-Baptiste Tong Nguyên Ba, consecrated him to the priesthood on 13 March 1937. Pius XII. Appointed him on 30 November 1956 as Apostolic Administrator of Phát Diệm.

John XXIII. Appointed him Apostolic Vicar of Phát Diệm and Titular Bishop of Numida on 24 January 1959. The Apostolic Vicar of Hanoi, Joseph Marie Trịnh Như Khuê, consecrated him to the bishophood on 26 April of that year.

In electoral terms, he chose In caritate non ficta. The Pope raised the apostolic vicariate to the bishopric on 24 November 1960 and thus he was appointed bishop of Phát Diệm. On 3 November 1998, John Paul II rescinded his age-related resignation.

References

20th-century Roman Catholic bishops in Vietnam
1909 births
2001 deaths